Sadovy is a rural locality (a settlement) in Timiryazevskoye Rural Settlement, Novousmansky District, Voronezh Oblast, Russia. The population was 205 as of 2010. There are three streets.

Geography 
Sadovy is located 32 km southeast of Novaya Usman (the district's administrative centre) by road. Krylovka is the nearest rural locality.

References 

Rural localities in Novousmansky District